is a railway station located in the city of Ichinoseki, Iwate Prefecture, Japan, operated by the East Japan Railway Company (JR East).

Lines
Iwanoshita Station is served by the Ōfunato Line, and is located 17.5 rail kilometers from the terminus of the line at Ichinoseki Station.

Station layout
Iwanoshita Station has one side platform serving a single bi-directional track. There is no station building, but only a shelter for waiting passengers. The station is unattended.

History
Iwanoshita Station opened on December 1, 1966. The station was absorbed into the JR East network upon the privatization of the Japan National Railways (JNR) on April 1, 1987.

Surrounding area
Some small businesses and stores have grown up around the station.
 Sunatetsu River
 Iwanoshita Police Office

See also
 List of Railway Stations in Japan

External links

  

Railway stations in Iwate Prefecture
Ōfunato Line
Railway stations in Japan opened in 1966
Ichinoseki, Iwate
Stations of East Japan Railway Company